Snaisgill is a hamlet in County Durham, in England. It is situated to the north of Middleton-in-Teesdale. The surrounding area was extensively mined for lead.

References

External links

A bouldering guide

Villages in County Durham